Mondragon, officially the Municipality of Mondragon, is a 3rd class municipality in the province of Northern Samar, Philippines. According to the 2020 census, it has a population of 41,415 people.

Geography

Barangays
Mondragon is politically subdivided into 24 barangays.

Bagasbas
Bugko
Cablangan
Cagmanaba
Cahicsan
Chitongco (Poblacion)
De Maria
Doña Lucia
Eco (Poblacion)
Flormina
Hinabangan
Imelda
La Trinidad
Makiwalo
Mirador
Nenita
Roxas
San Agustin
San Antonio
San Isidro
San Jose
San Juan
Santa Catalina
Talolora

Climate

Demographics

Economy

References

External links
 [ Philippine Standard Geographic Code]
 Philippine Census Information
 Local Governance Performance Management System

Municipalities of Northern Samar